Holminaria is a genus of Asian dwarf spiders that was first described by K. Y. Eskov in 1991.  it contains only three species, found in China, Mongolia, and Russia: H. pallida, H. prolata, and H. sibirica.

See also
 List of Linyphiidae species (A–H)

References

Araneomorphae genera
Linyphiidae
Spiders of Asia
Spiders of Russia